Walid Mohi Edine al Muallem ( Walīd Muḥīyy ad-Dīn al-Muʿallam; 13 January 194116 November 2020) was a Syrian diplomat and Ba'ath Party member who served as foreign minister from 2006 to 2020 and as deputy prime minister from 2012 to 2020.

Early life and education
Walid Muallem was born into a Sunni family on 13 January 1941 in Damascus. He received primary and secondary education in public schools from 1948 to 1960. Then he obtained a bachelor of arts degree in economics from Cairo University in 1963.

Career
Muallem was a member of the Syrian Regional Branch of the Arab Socialist Ba'ath Party. Muallem began his career at foreign ministry in 1964 and served in Syrian missions to Tanzania, Saudi Arabia, Spain and the United Kingdom. During his tenure in Saudi Arabia Muallem was a political attache. In May 1967 he and another Syrian political attache in Saudi Arabia, Jaber Bajbuj, were declared persona non grata by the Saudi authorities due to their alleged contacts with Ba'ath agents in Saudi Arabia, and both were ordered to leave the country within 24 hours.

He served as Syria's Ambassador to Romania from 1975 to 1980. Next he became the head of authentication and translation department at the foreign ministry in 1980 and his term ended in 1984. Later he served as the head of private offices department from 1984 to 1990. After serving as Syria's ambassador to the United States from 1990 to 2000, Muallem was named as assistant foreign minister in 2000. He was appointed deputy foreign minister in 2005 and given the Lebanese file by president Bashar al-Assad.

He was appointed as minister of foreign affairs on 11 February 2006 during a cabinet reshuffle in which his predecessor Farouk al-Sharaa became vice-president. Muallem stated in August 2006, "I am ready to be one of Hassan Nasrallahʹs soldiers." He also stated that Syria has a special relationship with Iran.

He was involved in Israeli-Syrian negotiations, both before and during his tenure as foreign minister.

Syrian Civil War
Early on in the Syrian Civil War, Muallem held frequent press conferences with Syrian media and Arab outlets. In August 2012, Muallem gave his first interview with a Western journalist since the start of the civil war, in English, saying that the United States slogan of "fighting international terrorism when ... supporting this terrorism in Syria" and stating the government's position that the United States was "the major player against Syria" as it sought to contain Iran. He denied the existence of the Shabiha, pro-government, paid militiamen alleged to have committed atrocities early on during the civil war while blaming 60% of Syria's violence on Turkey, Qatar and Saudi Arabia "with the United States exercising its influence over all others."

In October 2012, after United Nations Secretary General Ban Ki-Moon urged Syria to show compassion in light of the growing humanitarian crisis, Muallem spoke at the United Nations and blamed the United States, France, Turkey, Saudi Arabia, and Qatar for "aid[ing] terror" and "blatant interference" in Syria's affairs, mainly by supplying rebel groups with arms and money calling for Bashar al-Assad to step down. He called Western concerns over chemical weapons use "a joke" and a pretext for an Iraq War-like campaign. Later that month, Muallem also rejected calls by Ban to declare a unilateral ceasefire, insisting that governments that "finance, train and deliver weapons to the armed groups, notably Saudi Arabia, Qatar and Turkey" be stopped. In December 2012, he further blamed United States and European Union sanctions for the suffering in Syria.

In January 2013, after United Nations and Arab League envoy Lakhdar Brahimi said Bashar al-Assad should not take part in a transitional government, Muallem called on opposition groups to join a new cabinet under al-Assad, so long as they "reject foreign intervention."

During his speech during the Sixty-eighth session of the United Nations General Assembly in September 2013, Muallem claimed that "terrorists from more than 83 countries" are killing Syrian soldiers and civilians and compared the recent events of the Syrian Civil War to the September 11, 2001 attacks in the United States. In a separate interview with BBC correspondent Jeremy Bowen, Muallem said that the international peace talks were vital for Syria's future while these talks in Geneva "cannot succeed" while Turks, Saudis and Qataris are helping the rebels.

In January 2014, Muallem participated in the Geneva II Conference on Syria at Montreux.  He described the opposition as traitors and terrorists in his initial speech while accusing a number of states of supporting terrorism and deliberately attempting to destabilize Syria. Despite the conference rules permitting only ten minutes to each speaker, Muallem talked for over forty minutes before finishing and repeatedly ignored Ban Ki-moon attempts to conclude his speech.

In February 2016, after Saudi Arabia was planning to send its troops to Syria in order to fight against the Islamic State, Muallem warned that any foreign army soldiers who enter Syria without government consent would "return home in wooden coffins".

Following the September 2016 Deir ez-Zor air raid which killed up to 100 Syrian soldiers, Muallem said that the Syrian government "holds the United States fully responsible because facts show that it was an intentional attack, and not an error, even if the United States claims otherwise."

From 2012 until his death, he was listed on the EU sanction list. According to the EU as a government minister, he shared responsibility for the Syrian regime's violent repression of the civilian population.

Personal life and death
Muallem was married to Sawsan Khayat and had three children, Tarek, Shatha and Khaled. He died on the morning of 16 November 2020, at the age of 79, at Shami Hospital in Damascus. The cause of his death was not disclosed, but Muallem had been suffering from heart problems for years. He was buried at Mezzeh Cemetery.

See also
Foreign relations of Syria 
List of foreign ministers in 2017
List of current foreign ministers

References

External links
Ministry of Foreign Affairs official government website
"Fresh Light on the Syrian-Israeli Peace Negotiations" , Journal of Palestine Studies, vol. 26, no. 2, Winter 1997, interview

1941 births
2020 deaths
Cairo University alumni
Foreign ministers of Syria
Ambassadors of Syria to the United States
Ambassadors of Syria to Romania
Arab Socialist Ba'ath Party – Syria Region politicians
Syrian Sunni Muslims
Deputy Prime Ministers of Syria
Politicians from Damascus
People of the Syrian civil war